Ivo Rudic (24 January 1942 – 22 November 2009) was an Australian soccer player.

National team
Ivo Rudic played for Australia national team. He was a member of Australia national team for 1974 World Cup squad in West Germany, however he failed to debut and was an unused substitute during the tournament.

References

1942 births
2009 deaths
Australian soccer players
1974 FIFA World Cup players
Association football defenders